"Overjoyed" is a song by British band Bastille. It was released on 27 April 2012 as their first official single release through Virgin Records. It was the first single to be taken from their debut studio album Bad Blood. The track was also included in both their 2011 self-release the Laura Palmer EP and their 2013 US-only release the Haunt EP. Due to a release with little promotion, the track failed to chart in the United Kingdom. It is their only non-charting single from the album.

Music video
The music video was released onto YouTube on 3 November 2011. It was directed by Courtney Phillips and is a length of three minutes and forty-five seconds. It's the band first music video and, like the extended play the song was originally featured on, it is said to be heavily inspired by the television TV series Twin Peaks. It features a girl, likely representing the character Laura Palmer from the series, who leaves her room with a book and walks through the streets at night to go to a forest where she buries the book. She is also seen several times throughout the video standing near a lake in the forest (as seen in the single cover).

Following its premiere, popular music publication Q Magazine introduced the track as its 'Track of the Day' for 7 March 2012.

There are alternate videos of the band performing the song live at the Copped Hall. The Distance remix was also given a video.

Track listing
Digital download
 "Overjoyed" – 3:24
 "Sleepsong" – 3:40
 "Overjoyed" (Yeasayer Remix) – 4:09
 "Overjoyed" (Distance Remix) – 5:05
 "Overjoyed" (Ghostwriter Remix) – 3:50
 "Overjoyed" (Detour City Redux) – 4:14
 "Overjoyed" (music video) – 3:43

Charts

Release history

References

2011 songs
2012 singles
Bastille (band) songs
Virgin Records singles
Songs written by Dan Smith (singer)